Sentinels of Silence is a 1971 short documentary film on ancient Mexican civilizations. The film was produced by Manuel Arango, and directed and written by the filmmaker Robert Amram, and is notable for being the first and only short film to win two Academy Awards.

Plot
Sentinels of Silence provides an 18-minute helicopter-based aerial visit across the archeological ruins in Mexico including Teotihuacan, Monte Albán, Mitla, Tulum, Palenque, Chichen Itza and Uxmal. The film’s narration details pre-Columbian Mayan culture, focusing on its achievements in mathematics and astronomy, and then questions how and why the Mayan society seemed to disappear, leaving behind its structures as the eponymous silent sentinels.

Production
Sentinels of Silence was released in two versions, with Orson Welles providing the English-language narration and Ricardo Montalbán providing the Spanish-language narration. Both versions included a symphonic score by Mariano Moreno. Paramount Pictures acquired this production for U.S. theatrical release.

Academy Awards
Sentinels of Silence won two Academy Awards in 1972; one for Best Short Subject and one for Best Documentary Short Subject. This was the only time that a short film won Oscars in two categories. Afterwards, the Academy changed its rules to prevent documentaries from competing against narrative films in the Best Short Subject category.

Home video and non-theatrical release
Sentinels of Silence was released on VHS video by ALTI Publishing in 1990 under the new title "Sentinels of Silence: The Ruins of Ancient Mexico." To date, the film has not been made available on DVD. Although the film is no longer in theatrical circulation, the government of Mexico continues to present the film in non-theatrical screenings at its embassies and consulates around the world.

There is, however, a DVD edition distributed by Mexico Antiguo, for sale only in Mexico.

See also
 Orson Welles filmography

References

External links
 

1971 films
1971 documentary films
1971 short films
1970s Spanish-language films
1970s short documentary films
Mexican short documentary films
Live Action Short Film Academy Award winners
Best Documentary Short Subject Academy Award winners
Paramount Pictures short films
1970s Mexican films